Madang is a province of Papua New Guinea. The province is on the northern coast of mainland Papua New Guinea and has many of the country's highest peaks, active volcanoes and its biggest mix of languages.  The capital is the town of Madang.

Districts and LLGs and clans 
Each province in Papua New Guinea has one or more districts, and each district has one or more Local Level Government (LLG) areas. For census purposes, the LLG areas are subdivided into wards and those into census units.

Education
Tertiary educational institutions in Madang Province include:

Madang Technical College
Madang Marine Time College
Madang Teachers College
Divine Word University (DWU) is a national university and a leading tertiary institution in Papua New Guinea. Formerly Divine Word Institute, it was established by an Act of Parliament in 1980 and was established as a University in 1996. DWU It is ecumenical, coeducational and privately governed with government support.

Provincial leaders 

The province was governed by a decentralised provincial administration, headed by a Premier, from 1978 to 1995. Following reforms taking effect that year, the national government reassumed some powers, and the role of Premier was replaced by a position of Governor, to be held by the winner of the province-wide seat in the National Parliament of Papua New Guinea.

Premiers (1978–1995)

Governors (1995–present)

Members of the National Parliament

The province and each district is represented by a Member of the National Parliament.  There is one provincial electorate and each district is an open electorate.

Notable people 
 Yolarnie Amepou - herpetologist and conservationist.
 Julia Mage’au Gray - choreographer and tattoo artist.

References

 
Provinces of Papua New Guinea
Momase Region